The 1949 Maine Black Bears football team was an American football team that represented the University of Maine as a member of the Yankee Conference during the 1949 college football season. In its first season under head coach David M. Nelson, the team compiled a 2–4–1 record (2–0–1 against conference opponents) and tied with Connecticut for the conference championship.  The team played its home games at Alumni Field in Orono, Maine. Donald Barron was the team captain.

Schedule

References

Maine
Maine Black Bears football seasons
Yankee Conference football champion seasons
Maine Black Bears football